James Donald Charteris, 13th Earl of Wemyss and 9th Earl of March,  (born 22 June 1948), also known as Jamie Neidpath, is a British peer and landowner.

Biography

Early life
Wemyss is the second son of Francis David Charteris, 12th Earl of Wemyss, and his first wife, Mavis Murray. He was educated at Eton College. While a teenager he was Page of Honour to the Queen Mother. He went to Oxford (BA 1969, MA 1974), obtaining a DPhil from St Antony's College in 1975. He obtained a diploma from the Royal Agricultural College in 1978. He is known to have undergone an operation of trepanation, the practice of drilling holes in the head, in 1996 in Cairo. He said, "It seemed to be very beneficial."

Career
He runs Alro Group, a real estate fund management group.

He became heir apparent to the Earldoms of Wemyss and March on the death of his elder brother, Iain David Charteris, Lord Elcho, in 1954. He was subsequently known as Lord Neidpath as opposed to the usual courtesy title of Lord Elcho. He was appointed a Deputy Lieutenant of Gloucestershire in 2005, and is a supporter of UKIP, to whom he has made at least £54,000 in donations.

Personal life
He married the Hon. Catherine Guinness (born 1952), daughter of Jonathan Guinness, 3rd Baron Moyne (and granddaughter of Diana Mitford and Bryan Guinness), in July 1983. They have a son, Francis Richard (Dick) Charteris, Lord Elcho (b. 1984), who is the heir to the earldoms, and a daughter, Lady Mary Olivia Charteris, a model and singer. James and Catherine were divorced in 1988, and she married Robert Hesketh in 1990.

He later married Amanda Feilding in January 1995. She founded and directs the Beckley Foundation, a charitable trust which carries out pioneering scientific research into psychoactive drugs and consciousness, and promotes evidence-based, health-oriented drug policy reform. They live at Stanway House in Gloucestershire and at Gosford House in East Lothian.

His uncle, Martin Charteris, Baron Charteris of Amisfield, was Private Secretary to Queen Elizabeth II.

References

1948 births
13
UK Independence Party donors
People educated at Eton College
Living people
Deputy Lieutenants of Gloucestershire
Members of the Freedom Association
Earls of March (Scotland)
James
People from Stanway, Gloucestershire
Alumni of St Antony's College, Oxford